Saint Gallicanus was a Roman martyr in Egypt in 363 AD, during the reign of Julian. According to his "Acta" (in Acta SS., June, VII, 31), he was a distinguished general in the war against the Persians. He was also consul with Symmachus in 330 and perhaps also once before with Caesonius Bassus in 317. After his conversion to Christianity he retired to Ostia, founded a hospital where he worked with Saint Hilarinus and endowed a church built by Constantine I. Under Julian he was banished to Egypt, and lived with the hermits in the desert. A small church was built in his honour in the Trastevere of Rome. His relics are at Rome in the church of Sant'Andrea della Valle. The legend of his conversion was dramatized in the tenth century by the nun Roswitha. He is commemorated on 25 June.

Sources

External links
 Colonnade Statue St Peter's Square

Saints from Roman Italy